The Last of the Mohicans is a silent film of 1911. Directed by Theodore Marston and starring Frank Hall Crane, it was one of the first film adaptations of the novel The Last of the Mohicans by James Fenimore Cooper. As early as 1909 the novel had been brought to the screen by D.W. Griffith in a film titled  Leather Stocking .

In 1911, another film of the same title was produced by Powers Picture Plays.

Production 
The film was produced by Thanhouser Film Corporation and was shot in the state of New York, at Lake George.

Distribution 
Distributed by the Motion Picture Distributors and Sales Company, the film - a short film on a reel - was released in U.S. theaters on November 10, 1911.

Reception
One listing describes the film as "surprisingly faithful to the original".

References

1911 films
American silent films
American black-and-white films
Films directed by Theodore Marston
1910s American films